The Hombres are one of six teams currently competing in Slamball, previously known as the Diablos.

History
The Hombres (originally the Diablos) competed in the inaugural season of Slamball along with the Mob, Steal, Slashers, Rumble, and Bouncers for the first ever season of Slamball. That season, they made it the finals before losing to the Rumble 46–41. The next year they failed to make the playoffs, and the league went on hiatus until 2008. When Slamball returned, the Diablos were renamed the Hombres adapting a new gold and black color scheme. They made it to the playoffs but were eliminated in the 1st round by the Rumble.

Season-by-season

Personnel

Head coaches

Current roster

Slamball
Sports clubs established in 2002